Glen Edward Day (born November 16, 1965) is an American professional golfer who plays on the PGA Tour Champions. He was formerly a member of the PGA Tour. 

Day was born in Mobile, Alabama, and raised in Poplarville, Mississippi, by his mother Jeanne Bass Day.  Jeanne was widowed at the age of 28 when Glen was approximately 2 years of age.  His grandfather Glyndol Bass, was young Glen's primary male role model.  Bass, an avid golfer and member at Pearl River Valley Country Club just outside Poplarville, started Glen playing golf when he was 2 to 3 years of age.  By the age of 10, he held a 5 handicap and was able to regularly shoot par on 18 holes.  He graduated from Poplarville High School in 1983, attended the University of Oklahoma, then turned professional in 1988.  He has one sister, Danielle, and is married to the former Jennifer Ralston. They have two daughters, Whitney Elizabeth, born in 1994 and Francis Christina, born in 1996.

Day was the first golfer to win a professional tournament using the Nike Golf Ball by defeating Payne Stewart to win the 1999 MCI Classic played at the Sea Pines Plantation Harbor Town Golf Links, Hilton Head, South Carolina. It was his 154th PGA Tour start and his only PGA Tour win. In 2000, the first of two top-10s came at the first event of the season with a T-8 in the Mercedes Championship.  In 2001, he came in 4th in the MasterCard Colonial, and tied for 6th in the AT&T Pebble Beach National Pro-Am. In his forties, Day split his playing time between the PGA Tour and the Nationwide Tour. He later joined the PGA Tour Champions after turning 50.

Day is notorious for being an extremely deliberate player on the golf course.  In fact, the moniker "All Day," was hung on him by the legendary Jack Nicklaus. Day is one of the few golfers to receive a slow play penalty in a non-major (1995 Honda Classic).

Day is also a golf course architect, forming Day-Blalock Golf Course Design with Alan Blalock in 1999. He has featured in the top 50 of the Official World Golf Rankings, peaking at 30th in 2000.

Day resides in Little Rock, Arkansas.

Professional wins (2)

PGA Tour wins (1)

PGA Tour playoff record (1–0)

Asia Golf Circuit wins (1)

Playoff record
European Tour playoff record (0–1)

PGA Tour Champions playoff record (0–1)

Results in major championships

CUT = missed the half-way cut
"T" = tied

Summary

Most consecutive cuts made – 1 (six times)
Longest streak of top-10s – 0

Results in The Players Championship

CUT = missed the halfway cut
"T" indicates a tie for a place

Results in World Golf Championships

1Cancelled due to 9/11

QF, R16, R32, R64 = Round in which player lost in match play
"T" = Tied
DQ = Disqualified
NT = No tournament

See also
1993 PGA Tour Qualifying School graduates
2006 PGA Tour Qualifying School graduates

References

External links

American male golfers
Oklahoma Sooners men's golfers
PGA Tour golfers
Golf course architects
Golfers from Alabama
Golfers from Mississippi
Golfers from Florida
Golfers from Arkansas
Sportspeople from Mobile, Alabama
People from Poplarville, Mississippi
People from Palm Beach County, Florida
Sportspeople from Little Rock, Arkansas
1965 births
Living people